J. brevis may refer to:

Janibacter terrae, a Gram-positive bacterium, which includes the former species Janibacter brevis.
Jeletzkytes brevis, an extinct genus of scaphatoid ammonite in the genus Jeletzkytes.
Joculator brevis, a species of sea snail.